Jovana Petrović  (born ) is a Serbian  women's football goalkeeper, who plays in the Turkish Women's Super League for ALG Spor with jersey number 1. She is a member of the Serbia women's national team.

Club career 
Serbia
Petrović played for the Serbian SuperLiga  club ŽFK Crvena zvezda in Belgrade between 1 July 2021 and 31 December 2021.

Norway
On 1 January 2022, she went to Norway and transferred to the Toppserien club Avaldsnes IL. She appeared in ten matches.

Turkey
On 8 August 2022, she moved to Turkey and signed for the Gaziantep-based 2021-22 Turkish Women's Super League champion ALG Spor. She played at the 2022–23 UEFA Women's Champions League qualifying rounds' first match for ALG Spor.

International career 
Petrović was part of the Serbia women's national team at the  2021 Turkish Women's Cup held in Alanya, Antalya, Turkey.

References 

2001 births
Living people
Serbian women's footballers
Women's association football goalkeepers
Serbia women's international footballers
Serbian expatriate sportspeople in Norway
Expatriate women's footballers in Norway
Avaldsnes IL players
Serbian expatriate sportspeople in Turkey
Expatriate women's footballers in Turkey
Turkish Women's Football Super League players
ALG Spor players